Franklinfjellet is a mountain in Gustav V Land, on the peninsula Botniahalvøya of Nordaustlandet, Svalbard, Norway.  It has a height of 430 m.a.s.l. The mountain is named after British naval officer John Franklin.

References

Mountains of Nordaustlandet